Saturday Kitchen Live is a British cookery programme, that is broadcast live on BBC One every Saturday between 10.00am and 11.30am produced by Cactus TV.

History

2002–2003
After a pilot hosted by Ainsley Harriott on 14 April 2001, the show was launched on 26 January 2002 and was originally broadcast as a BBC production for the Open University under an educational remit. It was hosted by Gregg Wallace, then a relatively unknown presenter. He was joined by a celebrity chef each week in a pre-recorded format and with a low budget, using archived content from the likes of Keith Floyd and Rick Stein to fill the show. After the first series, the second series was broadcast live.

2003–2006
After the success of the first two series, the programme was relaunched with established celebrity chef Antony Worrall Thompson as the host, initially guest hosting from May before taking over on 13 September. The format was tweaked, moving away from the educational remit and simple meals to more aspirational food with an increase in chefs, a number of whom had Michelin stars, and celebrity guests. The BBC archive was retained for the revamped format, with Worrall Thompson and the guest chefs preparing dishes, with the clips used to allow clean-up and "resetting" of the studio kitchen.

During the summer of 2004, the programme temporarily moved to BBC One and aired as Saturday Brunch, live from Worrall Thompson's home. Subsequently, in January 2006, the show moved from BBC Two to BBC One on a three-month trial that became permanent, a decision which drew controversy after the moving of children's programming from its regular slot on the channel for the first time since the 1970s.

2006–2016

After Worrall Thompson left the network to present Saturday Cooks! in June 2006, James Martin took over as host from 24 June. During Martin's tenure, the audience increased from 1.2 million to around 2.5 million, peaking at 2.7 million on 9 January 2010.

On 8 September 2012, the first episode was broadcast from a new studio set, which saw a new design and the addition of mains gas and running water.

On 23 February 2016, Martin announced that he would be leaving the show to concentrate on other commitments, and "to have a lie in" on a Saturday. His last show was on 26 March 2016.

Among those to cover in Martin's absence were Matt Tebbutt and John Torode.

2016- Present

Presenters 
Matt Tebbutt is the predominant presenter, with Angela Hartnett and Anna Haugh among those to have deputised for Tebbutt.

Drinks experts 
Each week, a drinks expert pairs various drinks to go with the studio dishes. Helen McGinn and Olly Smith are the predominant experts.

Featured chefs 
Among the chefs to feature in 2021, were: Paul Ainsworth, Jason Atherton, Gennaro Contaldo, Niklas Ekstedt, Angela Hartnett, Anna Haugh, Yotam Ottolenghi, Glynn Purnell, Cyrus Todiwala, and Marcus Wareing.

Celebrity guests 
In 2021, Saturday Kitchen were joined by a variety of celebrity guests, including: Michael Ball, Shirley Ballas, Gary Barlow, John Bishop, Jay Blades, Emma Bunton, Ronan Keating, Oti Mabuse, Harry Redknapp, Stanley Tucci, and Jack Whitehall.

Features

Each show typically includes a host chef and two guest chefs, each cooking in the studio. They are joined by a celebrity guest, usually on to promote a forthcoming or current project.

Each guest chef's dish is paired with a drink chosen by an expert.

In between each studio dish, excerpts are shown from the BBC Archives. The footage has most commonly come from Rick Stein and Keith Floyd, but have also featured James Martin, The Hairy Bikers, and Tom Kerridge, among many others.

Before the introduction of the Heaven and Hell feature, the programme previously featured Worrall Thompson and guest chefs pitching a dish to be cooked, which the public voted on and a running total of wins were recorded by using fridge magnets.

Heaven or Hell
Each show concludes with the host and guest chefs cooking the celebrity guest a dish containing their favourite or least-favourite ingredient/s.

Which dish is cooked depends on an online vote for viewers at home to choose heaven or hell. Formerly, only the viewers who phoned in to the show were able to vote, along with the guest chefs.

Saturday Kitchen Best Bites
In-addition to the main episode shown on Saturday mornings, there is a compilation episode called Saturday Kitchen Best Bites, which features clips from previous episodes and is hosted by the same presenter(s).

Controversies

Competition with ITV
In June 2006, it was revealed that host Antony Worrall Thompson was to move to ITV to host a similar cooking show in the same slot, Saturday Cooks!, though later rescheduled to noon. In addition to this move, the new show was to be made by the Saturday Kitchen producer, Prospect Pictures. In light of the changes, the programme was revamped with new host James Martin and new producer Cactus TV.

Misleading viewers
In February 2007, the programme was accused of misleading viewers to phone in to an apparently live segment, which was found to have been pre-recorded a week earlier.

Dietary requirements
In July 2016, Matt Tebbutt hosted an episode of Saturday Kitchen. Tebbutt was discussing food commandments with food critic and writer Jay Rayner, when Tebbutt said "I'd like people in restaurants to leave their dietary requirement at home.  Unless, it's obviously life-threatening—that would be wrong!  There are so many dietary requirements these days."

One social media user stated: "For your information, dietary requirements aren't fussiness. Coeliac? Allergies?  Ignorance makes dining out impossible for many." Another said: "I wish intolerant views were left at home, so disappointing."

Other tweets read: "I love, love Saturday Kitchen, but not everyone with a dietary requirement is trying to make life difficult for restaurants" and "thanks for making those of us with dietary requirements feel even worse about eating out."

Tebbutt responded: "Apologies, was being flippant.  I mean the 'faddy' eaters amongst us, that's all."

Presenter selections
In January 2017, viewers took to social media to express their displeasure at Michel Roux, Jrs selection as host for an episode of Saturday Kitchen. A Guardian investigation published in November 2016, alleged that Roux had not paid some staff the minimum wage.  The article also alleged that service charges added to bills had been used for restaurant revenues. Some viewers stated that they could not watch while Roux hosted.

Roux has hosted several times since.

Spin-offs
The programme has produced a number of spin off series, including Celebration Kitchen, Spring Kitchen, Christmas Kitchen and Saturday Kitchen: Best Bites, a compilation programme currently airing on Sunday mornings on BBC Two, as well as the Saturday Kitchen Cookbook with James Martin, published by BBC Books in July 2007.

Celebration Kitchen
An identical format, with a specific focus on foods associated with respective religious festivals, such as Eid al-Fitr, Passover and Diwali.

Christmas Kitchen
Christmas Kitchen is a weekday, daytime spin-off of Saturday Kitchen.

Series 1 (2013):Each show, James Martin was joined by guest chefs, including: Gennaro Contaldo, Daniel Galmiche, Ching-He Huang, Nathan Outlaw, Theo Randall, Vivek Singh, and Bryn Williams.

In addition to this, Martin was joined by a different star each show. These included: James Blunt, Tom Chambers, Anthony Head, Ben Miller, and Sharleen Spiteri.

Series 2 (2014):James Martin returned for another 10-episode run of Christmas Kitchen in December 2014. Over the 10 episodes, he was joined by several respected chefs, including: Jason Atherton, Galton Blackiston, Monica Galetti, Ching-He Huang, Nathan Outlaw, Glynn Purnell, and Bryn Williams.

Also joining Martin were various celebrity guests, including: Jon Culshaw, Sophie Ellis-Bextor, Micky Flanagan, Dave Gorman, Alex Jones, Denise Lewis, Al Murray, Sarah Parish, and Frank Skinner.

Series 3 (2016):Matt Tebbutt and Andi Oliver replaced Martin in the presenting role.

As well as appearances from Sabrina Ghayour, Theo Randall, and Vivek Singh, Tebbutt and Oliver were also joined by previous Great British Bake Off contestants, including former winners Candice Brown, Edd Kimber, Frances Quinn, and Jo Wheatley.

There were celebrity appearances from Ronni Ancona, Helen George, David Haig, Aled Jones, Miles Jupp, Adil Ray, Louise Redknapp, and Nina Wadia.

Spring Kitchen with Tom Kerridge
Spring Kitchen was a weekday, daytime spin-off of Saturday Kitchen presented by Tom Kerridge. The series aired for 14 episodes in April 2014.

For each show, Kerridge was joined by different chefs, including: Jason Atherton, Michael Caines, Daniel Clifford, Gennaro Contaldo, Lisa Goodwin-Allen, Angela Hartnett, Ching-He Huang, Tom Kitchin, Glynn Purnell, Theo Randall, and Bryn Williams.

Kerridge was also joined by a diverse cross-section of celebrity guests, including: Amanda Abbington, Chris Addison, Amanda Byram, Nicki Chapman, Jenny Eclair, Chris Hollins, Alex Jones, Jo Joyner, Nick Knowles, Dominic Littlewood, Craig Revel Horwood, Gaby Roslin, Danny Wallace, and Paul Young.

References

External links 
 
 

BBC Television shows
2000s British cooking television series
2010s British cooking television series
2020s British cooking television series
2001 British television series debuts
British cooking television shows
English-language television shows
Saturday mass media